Stylonurella is a genus of prehistoric eurypterid. It is classified within the Parastylonuridae family and contains three species, S. arnoldi and S. beecheri from the Devonian of Pennsylvania, United States and S. spinipes from the Silurian of Kip Burn, Scotland.

Description 

Stylonurella was a small stylonuroid, possessing a subquadrate prosoma with approximately the same length as width. The midsection was slightly constricted and the eyes were parallel and anteriorly located in the anterior half of the carapace. The metastoma and first two appendages are unknown, the third and fourth prosomal legs are very short and the last two walking legs are very long. The metasoma is very narrow.

Classification 
Though one of the earliest described stylonurines, described shortly after the description of Stylonurus itself, it has no close relations to that genus. Indeed, there are numerous and apparent differences. For instance, the eyes of Stylonurus are located on the posterior half of the carapace and those of Stylonurella are on the anterior half. Furthermore, there are noticeable differences between Stylonurella and its closest relative, Parastylonurus, for instance the widely different shapes of the carapaces (quadrate in Stylonurella and subrounded in Parastylonurus).

Species 

Stylonurella contains three valid species, with other named species now seen as invalid or as part of other genera.
 Stylonurella? arnoldi Ehlers, 1935  - Pennsylvania, USA (Devonian)
 Stylonurella? beecheri Hall, 1884 - Pennsylvania, USA (Devonian)
 Stylonurella spinipes Page, 1859 - Kip Burn, Scotland (Silurian)
Invalid or reassigned species are listed below:
 "Stylonurella" logani Woodward, 1872 - Kip Burn, Scotland (Silurian), synonym of S. spinipes.
 "Stylonurella" modestus Clarke & Ruedemann, 1912 - New York, USA (Ordovician), a pseudofossil.
 "Stylonurella" otisius Clarke, 1907 - Eastern USA (Silurian), reclassified as a species of Clarkeipterus.
 "Stylonurella" ruedemanni Størmer, 1934 - Ringerike, Norway (Silurian), reclassified as a species of Kiaeropterus.

See also 
 List of eurypterids

References

Stylonuroidea
Silurian arthropods of Europe
Silurian eurypterids
Eurypterids of Europe
Devonian eurypterids
Eurypterids of North America